Johnsonville State Historic Park is a state park in Humphreys County in the U.S. state of Tennessee. This  park commemorates the Battle of Johnsonville, which was fought in 1864 during the Civil War, and the historic town site of Johnsonville, which was inundated by the creation of Kentucky Lake by the Tennessee Valley Authority in the 1940s. It is located north of New Johnsonville.

History
The park commemorates the Battle of Johnsonville and the historic town site that was in existence from 1864-1944. The town was flooded by the creation of Kentucky Lake, an impoundment of the Tennessee River created by the construction of Kentucky Dam in 1944.

Activities
There several things to do at Johnsonville:

Birding
There is a wooded trail that provides a look several species of birds including Gulls, Sandpipers, Woodpeckers and White-breasted Nuthatches. And sometimes even Bald Eagles.

During winter and migration times one will see Bay Ducks and Ring-tailed Gulls.

Fishing
The Tennessee River's impoundment of Kentucky Lake provides fishing opportunities.

Hiking
There are three hiking trails in the park:

 Historic Johnsonville Trail is 2.05 miles long
 African-American Cemetery Loop Trail is 0.35 miles long
 Civil War Forts Trail is 0.65 miles long
 Old Railway Trail is 0.7 miles long

References

External links
Official site

State parks of Tennessee
Protected areas of Humphreys County, Tennessee
Museums in Humphreys County, Tennessee
American Civil War museums in Tennessee